Hettie Vyrine Barnhill, is a choreographer-dancer raised in St Louis, Missouri.  She started her dance career at the age of 3 at The Pelagie Green Wren Dance Studio.  Barnhill made her Broadway debut in Fela!, a musical based on events in the life of groundbreaking Nigerian composer and activist Fela Anikulapo Kuti. Barnhill is a member of Sigma Gamma Rho sorority, one of the nine African-American sororities.

Hettie Barnhill also participated in the 60x60 project's 60x60 Dance at the World Financial Center Winter Garden Atrium 
 and at The Sheldon in her hometown St Louis, Missouri.  In 2011, Hettie Barnhill became the dance coordinator for 60x60 Dance performances at Dance Parade in New York City and at The Sheldon in St Louis, Missouri. - "It's the perfect mixture of improv and structure with the marriage of movement and music," Barnhill said.

In 2011 the NAACP honored Hettie Barnhill for her work as a singer, dancer, actress and choreographer. The award honors her achievement in arts and culture. Barnhill describes it as particularly meaningful because the entertainment business often focuses on looks, not character. "(That world) can be very superficial, and it can be taxing on your spirit," she said. "I know that's what I do, and I love it, but this award kind of makes it worth all the hardships that come with being an artist."

Articles
A Few Minutes With Hettie Barnhill  Alive Magazine, October 5, 2011 4:48 pm
East St. Louis native to receive award at NAACP event BND, Saturday, Oct. 01, 2011 
St. Louis stars lend talent to ‘Fela!’on stage and through Original Cast Recording By Kenya Vaughn Of The St. Louis American Wednesday, June 9, 2010
 Broadway Best - Hettie Barnhill of Fela! dances her way to the top of the world. BY KRISTA-ALANA TRAVIS Gotham Magazine

References

External links 
 Hettie Barnhill Official Website
 Fela! Official Website Biography Page

Living people
American female dancers
Dancers from Missouri
People from St. Louis
Year of birth missing (living people)
21st-century American women